"I Can't Make It" is a song that was released in March 1967 by English band Small Faces. The single peaked at number 26 on the UK Singles Chart.

Song profile
When "I Can't Make It" was released in 1967, Small Faces had acrimoniously left the management of Don Arden and were signed to Andrew Loog Oldham's Immediate label.  However, due to contractual obligations, Decca released the song, and Immediate agreed to produce and license the song back to them until the issue was resolved. The band refused to promote the single and as a direct result, the song only managed to climb to No. 26 in the charts. The BBC also initially banned the song for the dubious sounding lyrics which they thought were of a sexual nature; the lyrics are actually ambiguous and it is left to the listener to decide their true meaning.

The B-side, "Just Passing", is a short whimsical song only a minute long and is in the style of The Beach Boys song, "You Still Believe in Me".

In April 1967, Small Faces performed a live version of "I Can't Make It" on the well-known British television show, Morecambe and Wise, as well as their UK number-one single, "All or Nothing". The recording is notable for the particularly strong live vocal performance by Marriott. The episode was transmitted six months later.

The song can be found on side two of the group's 1969 posthumous double-album The Autumn Stone. "I Can't Make It" and "Just Passing" were also released as bonus tracks on the deluxe editions of From the Beginning in 2012. Furthermore, stereo mixes of both tracks are included on the deluxe editions of the band's 1967 eponymous album.

See also
Small Faces discography

Notes

External links
The Official Small Faces Site
Steve Marriott – The Official Site

Small Faces songs
1967 singles
Songs written by Ronnie Lane
Songs written by Steve Marriott
1967 songs
Decca Records singles
Songs banned by the BBC